Pausanias was king of the ancient Greek kingdom of Macedon for around a year, from 394/3 to 393/2. He was the son of Aeropus II and an unknown mother, but he did not succeed his father when Aeropus died in July or August 394/3 BC. Instead, Amyntas II ruled Macedonia for several months before being assassinated in August or September 394/3 by the Elimieotan Derdas. According to Diodorus, Pausanias himself was assassinated sometime in 393/2 by Amyntas III, who then succeeded him as King of Macedonia. However, Diodorus also entirely omits the reign of Amyntas II who all other ancient sources and modern scholars agree ruled before Pausanias.

There is a minority view among scholars that Aeropus II was a Lyncestian prince, rather than an Argead, who married into the dynasty, therefore enabling him later to become regent for Orestes. Of course, this implies that Pausanias was not an Argead as well. However, the majority of historians believe Aeropus to be Perdiccas II's son and thus a member of the dynasty.

References

Notes

Citations

4th-century BC Macedonian monarchs
4th-century BC rulers
Old Macedonian kingdom
Argead kings of Macedonia
4th-century BC murdered monarchs
393 BC deaths